Okeene is a town in Blaine County, Oklahoma, United States. The population was 1,204 at the 2010 census. The name was created by combining the last letters of Cherokee and Cheyenne.

Geography
Okeene is located in northeastern Blaine County at  (36.116516, -98.318424), at the intersection of state highways 8 and 51. OK-8 leads south  to Watonga, the county seat, and northwest  to Fairview. OK-51 leads east  to Hennessey and west  to Canton.

Demographics

As of the census of 2000, there were 1,240 people, 504 households, and 336 families residing in the town. There were 603 housing units at an average density of 263.2 per square mile (101.7/km2). The racial makeup of the town was 97.34% White, 0.48% African American, 0.48% Native American, 0.08% Asian, 0.81% from other races, and 0.81% from two or more races. Hispanic or Latino of any race were 3.87% of the population.

There were 504 households, out of which 29.6% had children under the age of 18 living with them, 56.5% were married couples living together, 7.3% had a female householder with no husband present, and 33.3% were non-families. 31.7% of all households were made up of individuals, and 19.6% had someone living alone who was 65 years of age or older. The average household size was 2.34 and the average family size was 2.95.

In the town, the population was spread out, with 25.4% under the age of 18, 6.3% from 18 to 24, 23.1% from 25 to 44, 22.2% from 45 to 64, and 23.0% who were 65 years of age or older. The median age was 41 years. For every 100 females, there were 94.1 males. For every 100 females age 18 and over, there were 89.9 males.

The median income for a household in the town was $31,471, and the median income for a family was $37,917. Males had a median income of $28,500 versus $19,297 for females. The per capita income for the town was $18,444. About 8.6% of families and 9.9% of the population were below the poverty line, including 12.5% of those under age 18 and 6.4% of those age 65 or over.

Public School System
Okeene's public school system consists of an elementary school, middle school, and high school.

Historic Sites
St. Anthony of Padua Church was begun on December 20, 1921 and completed in 1924 at a cost of $85,000, not including donated work and materials.  It stands as one of the oldest churches in Oklahoma.

Three NHRP-listed sites are located in Okeene, being the Okeene Flour Mill off Oklahoma State Highway 51, the Sooner Co-op Association Elevator (West) at 302 West F Street, and the Shinn Family Barn to the southeast.

References

Towns in Blaine County, Oklahoma
Towns in Oklahoma